was a Japanese daimyō of the early late-Edo period. The son of the 11th shōgun Tokugawa Ienari, he succeeded Tokugawa Narimasa as head of the Tayasu Tokugawa house, before succeeding to the Tokugawa house of Owari Domain in 1839. His childhood name was Tanabenosuke (要之丞).

Family
 Father: 11th shōgun Tokugawa Ienari
 Mother: Ocho no Kata (?-1852) later Sokuseiin
 Adopted Fathers:
 Tokugawa Narimasa
 Tokugawa Nariharu
 Adopted Mother:
 Shimazu Shigehime (1773-1844) wife of Tokugawa Ienari
 Wife: Tokugawa Naohime daughter of Tokugawa Narimasa, head of the Tayasu branch of the Tokugawa house
 Concubine: Miyata no Kata
 Children:
 Shomaru (1846-1847) inherited Hitotsubashi-Tokugawa family by Miyata
 Toshihime married Asano Yoshiteru of Hiroshima Domain
 Fushihime married Matsudaira Noritoshi

Reference

|-

1810 births
1845 deaths
Lords of Owari